The 2011 Albirex Niigata season was Albirex Niigata's eighth consecutive season in J.League Division 1. It also includes the 2011 J. League Cup, and the 2011 Emperor's Cup.

Match results

J. League

League table

Results summary

Results by round

J. League Cup

Emperor's Cup

Players

First team squad

Out on loan

Starting XI 
Last updated on 3 February 2012.

References

Albirex Niigata
Albirex Niigata seasons